In the Middle may refer to:

 "In the Middle" (Sugababes song), 2004
 "In the Middle" (The Mamas song), 2021
"In the Middle" (Ai song), 2021
 "In the Middle" (Alexander O'Neal song), 1993
"In the Middle", a song by Trey Songz from the album I Gotta Make It
"In the Middle", a song by Theory of a Deadman from the album Gasoline
"In the Middle", a song by Dodie Clark from the EP You
"In the Middle", a song by the Wanted from the album Word of Mouth

See also
 The Middle (TV series), American sitcom